Alejandro Davidovich Fokina was the defending champion but chose not to defend his title.

Pedro Martínez won the title after defeating Roberto Carballés Baena 6–4, 6–1 in the final.

Seeds

Draw

Finals

Top half

Bottom half

References

External links
Main draw
Qualifying draw

Copa Sevilla - 1
2021 Singles